Elvira Uladzimirauna Herman (born 9 January 1997) is a Belarusian athlete specialising in the sprint hurdles. She won the gold medal at the 2018 European Championships At the 2018 European Athletics Golden Tracks awards in Lausanne Elvira received the award as Europe's female rising star in 2018.

In 2019, she won the silver medal in the team event at the 2019 European Games held in Minsk, Belarus.

She has personal bests of 12.64	seconds in the 100 metres hurdles (Šamorín 2018) and 8.05 seconds in the 60 metres hurdles (Mogilyov 2018).

International competitions

References

1997 births
Living people
Belarusian female hurdlers
Athletes (track and field) at the 2014 Summer Youth Olympics
Sportspeople from Pinsk
Universiade medalists in athletics (track and field)
European Athletics Rising Star of the Year winners
Universiade silver medalists for Belarus
Athletes (track and field) at the 2019 European Games
European Games medalists in athletics
European Games gold medalists for Belarus
European Games silver medalists for Belarus
Medalists at the 2017 Summer Universiade
Athletes (track and field) at the 2020 Summer Olympics
Olympic athletes of Belarus